This is the discography of English gothic rock band Fields of the Nephilim.

Albums

Studio albums

Live albums

Compilation albums

Box sets

Video albums

EPs

Singles

References

Discographies of British artists
Rock music group discographies